Taraberdino (Tarabirźe) is a rural locality (a selo) in Kushnarenkovsky Selsoviet, Kushnarenkovsky District, Bashkortostan, Russia. The population was 1,576 as of 2010. There are 32 streets.

Geography 
Taraberdino is located 3 km southeast of Kushnarenkovo (the district's administrative centre) by road. Kushnarenkovo is the nearest rural locality.

References 

Rural localities in Kushnarenkovsky District